Japheth  ( Yép̄eṯ, in pausa  Yā́p̄eṯ;) is one of the three sons of Noah in the Book of Genesis, in which he plays a role in the story of Noah's drunkenness and the curse of Ham, and subsequently in the Table of Nations as the ancestor of the peoples of the Aegean Sea, Anatolia, and elsewhere. In medieval and early modern European tradition he was considered to be the progenitor of the European peoples, while Islamic traditions also include the Chinese people among his descendants.

Etymology
The meaning of the name Japheth ( y-p-ṭ) is disputable. There are two possible sources to the meaning of the name:
 From Aramaic root  (p-ṭ-h), meaning to extend. In this case, the name would mean may He extend (Rashi).
 From Hebrew root  (y-p-h), meaning beauty, in which case the name would mean beautiful.

Japheth in the Book of Genesis

Japheth first appears in the Hebrew Bible as one of the three sons of Noah, saved from the Flood through the Ark. In the Book of Genesis, they are always in the order "Shem, Ham, and Japheth" when all three are listed. However Genesis 9:24 calls Ham the youngest, and Genesis 10:21 refers ambiguously to Shem as "brother of Japheth the elder," which could mean that either is the eldest. Most modern writers accept Shem-Ham-Japheth as reflecting birth order, but this is not always the case: Moses and Rachel also appear at the head of such lists despite explicit descriptions of them as younger siblings.

Following the Flood, Japheth is featured in the story of Noah's drunkenness. Ham sees Noah drunk and naked in his tent and tells his brothers, who then cover their father with a cloak while avoiding the sight; when Noah awakes he curses Canaan, the son of Ham, and blesses Shem and Japheth: "Blessed be the Lord God of Shem and may Canaan be his slave; and may God enlarge Japheth and may he dwell in the tents of Shem, and may Canaan be his slave!”

Chapter 10 of Genesis, the Table of Nations, describes how earth was populated by the sons of Noah following the Flood, beginning with the descendants of Japheth:

Origin of Japheth
The Book of Genesis is the first of the five books of the Torah, that contains the account of Israel's origins as a people. Some scholars see this as a product of the Achaemenid Empire (probably 450–350 BCE), although some would place its production in the Hellenistic period (333–164 BCE) or even the Hasmonean dynasty (140–37 BCE). As almost none of the persons, places and stories in the first eleven chapters of Genesis (called the primeval history) are ever mentioned anywhere else in the Bible, some scholars surmise that the story of Japheth and his brothers is a late composition, attached to Genesis to serve as an introduction to that book and to the Torah.

Japheth (in Hebrew, Yafet or Yefet) may be a transliteration of the Greek Iapetos, the ancestor of the Hellenic peoples. His sons and grandsons associate him with the geographic area of the eastern Mediterranean and Asia Minor — Ionia/Javan, Rhodes/Rodanim, Cyprus/Kittim, and other points in the region of Greece and Asia Minor. The point of the "blessing of Japheth" seems to be that Japheth (a Greek-descended people) and Shem (the Israelites) would rule jointly over Canaan (Palestine). From the 19th century until the late 20th century it was usual to see Japheth as a reference to the Philistines, who shared dominion over Canaan during the pre-monarchic and early monarchic period of Israel's history. This view accorded with the understanding of the origin of the Book of Genesis, which was seen as having been composed in stages beginning with the time of King Solomon, when the Philistines still existed (they vanished from history after the Assyrian conquest of Canaan). However, Genesis 10:14 identifies their ancestor as Ham rather than Japheth.

Descendants

In the Bible, Japheth is ascribed seven sons: Gomer, Magog, Tiras, Javan, Meshech, Tubal, and Madai. According to Josephus (Antiquities of the Jews I.6):

Josephus subsequently detailed the nations supposed to have descended from the seven sons of Japheth.

The "Book of Jasher", published by Talmudic rabbis in the 17th century, provides some new names for Japheth's grandchildren not found in the Bible, and provided a much more detailed genealogy (see Japhetic).

In Jewish tradition, Abraham's wife Keturah was a descendant of Japheth.

Europeans

In the seventh century, archbishop Isidore of Seville wrote his noted encyclopedic-historical work, in which he traces the origins of most of the nations of Europe back to Japheth. Scholars in almost every European nation continued to repeat and develop Isidore of Seville's assertion of descent from Noah through Japheth into the nineteenth century.

William Shakespeare's play Henry IV, Part II contains a wry comment about people who claim to be related to royal families.  Prince Hal notes of such people,

The Georgian historian and linguist Ivane Javakhishvili associated Japheth's sons with certain ancient tribes, called Tubals (Tabals, Greek: Tibarenoi) and Meshechs (Meshekhs/Mosokhs, Greek: Moschoi), who they claim represent non-Indo-European and non-Semitic, possibly "Proto-Iberian" tribes of Asia Minor of the 3rd-1st millennia BC.

In the Polish tradition of Sarmatism, the Sarmatians, an Iranic people, were said to be descended from Japheth, son of Noah, enabling the Polish nobility to imagine that their ancestry could be traced directly to Noah.

In Scotland, histories tracing the Scottish people to Japheth were published as late as George Chalmers' well-received Caledonia, published in 3 volumes from 1807 to 1824.

In Islamic tradition

Japheth is not mentioned by name in the Quran but is referred to indirectly in the narrative of Noah. Muslim exegesis of the Quran, however, names all of Noah's sons, and these include Japheth. In identifying Japheth's descendants, Muslim exegesis mostly agrees with the Biblical tradition. In Islamic tradition, he is usually regarded as the ancestor of the Gog and Magog tribes. Islamic tradition also tends to identify the descendants of Japheth as including the Turks, Khazars, Chinese, Mongols, and Slavs. According to Abū’l-Ghāzī who wrote the 17th century text, Shajara-i Tarākima (Genealogy of the Turkmen), the descendants of Ham went to Africa, Sam to Iran, and Yafes (Japheth) went to the banks of the Itil and Yaik rivers and had eight sons named Turk, Khazar, Saqlab, Rus, Ming, Chin, Kemeri, and Tarikh. As Japheth was dying he established Turk, his firstborn son, as his successor. According to Hui Muslim writer, Liu Chih, after Noah's flood, Japheth inherited China as the eastern part of the Earth, while Shem inherited Arabia as the middle part, and Ham inherited Europe as the western part of the world. 

Some Muslim traditions narrated that 36 languages of the world could be traced back to Japheth.

In popular culture

Japheth is a major character in the second act of Stephen Schwartz's musical, Children of Eden. In this rendition, Japheth has fallen in love with the family servant, Yonah (created entirely for the show). He wants to bring her onto the ark to allow her to survive the flood, but Noah forbids this as Father (God) is trying to wipe the world free of those descended from Cain. Yonah is descended from Cain, despite her good heart and love from the family. Japheth secretly brings her aboard, and she is eventually discovered by Ham and Shem. Japheth defends her from Noah and is about to kill Shem in his rage. Yonah stops and calms him, and Noah decides to let her stay. The flood passes and the brothers all depart for different regions to populate the world, but Japheth and Yonah decide they want to search for Eden. Noah blesses their journey by passing the staff of Adam to Japheth. Smaller casts of the show usually have the actor who portrays Cain to also portray Japheth.

See also

 Caucasian race
 Japhetic theory (linguistics)
 Sons of Noah
 Wives aboard the Ark

References

Citations

Bibliography

External links

 Easton Bible dictionary about Japheth
 Smith's Bible Dictionary about Japheth
 International Standard Bible Encyclopedia: Japheth
 Japheth in the Jewish Encyclopedia
 Japheth's family tree at complete-bible-genealogy.com

Children of Noah

Bereshit (parashah)
Noach (parashah)